Webster County is a county located in the U.S. state of Kentucky. As of the 2020 census, the population was 13,017. Its county seat is Dixon. Its largest city is Providence. It is the southernmost county in the Evansville, IN–KY Metropolitan Statistical Area. The county was formed in 1860 from parts of Henderson, Hopkins, and Union Counties and named for American statesman Daniel Webster (1782-1852). It was mainly pro-Confederate during the American Civil War and was the site of several skirmishes and some guerrilla warfare. Since 2018 it has been a moist county, with Providence and Sebree voting to allow alcohol sales, and Clay doing so in 2022.

Geography
Webster County is part of the Western Coal Field region of Kentucky.

Adjacent counties
 Henderson County  (north)
 McLean County  (northeast)
 Hopkins County  (southeast)
 Caldwell County  (south)
 Crittenden County  (southwest)
 Union County  (northwest)

Demographics

As of the census of 2010, 5,272 households, and 3,716 families residing in the county. The racial makeup of the county was 91.4% White, 4.1% Black or African American, 0.2% Native American, 0.3% Asian, 0.3% Pacific Islander, 2.3% from other races, and 1.4% from two or more races. 4.3% of the population were Hispanic or Latino of any race.

There were 5,272 households, out of which 27.2% had children under the age of 18 living with them, 55% were married couples living together, 10.8% had a female householder with no husband present, and 29.5% were non-families. 25.4% of all households were made up of individuals, and 11.6% had someone living alone who was 65 years of age or older.  The average household size was 2.51 and the average family size was 2.98.

In the county, the population was spread out, with 25.9% under the age of 19, 5.8% from 20 to 24, 25% from 25 to 44, 28.2% from 45 to 64, and 15.1% who were 65 years of age or older.  The median age was 40.1 years. 49.7% of the population is male and 50.3% female.

The median income for a household in the county was $39,635, and the median income for a family was $49,580. Males employed full-time had a median income of $41,662 versus $26,502 for females. The per capita income for the county was $18,879.  About 11.9% of families and 16% of the population were below the poverty line, including 21.9% of those under age 18 and 11.6% of those age 65 or over.

Government officials
 County Judge/Executive - Stephen "Steve" Henry
 Providence Magistrate - Tony Felker
 Sebree/Slaughters Magistrate - Jerry "Poogie" Brown
 Dixon/Clay Magistrate - Chad Townsend
 County Attorney - William Clint Prow
 Coroner - Todd Vanover
 Sheriff - Frankie Springfield
 Jailer - Morgan McKinley
 County Surveyor - Keith Whitledge
 Property Valuation Administrator - Jeffrey D. Kelley
 County Clerk -  Valerie Franklin Newell
 Circuit Clerk - Janet Cole

National Association of Counties

Communities

Cities
 Clay
 Dixon (county seat)
 Providence
 Sebree
 Slaughters
 Wheatcroft

Census-designated places
 Onton
 Poole (partially in Henderson County)

Other unincorporated communities
 Blackford
 Diamond
 Lisman
 Little Zion
 Ortiz
 Pratt
 Stanhope
 Vanderburg
 Wanamaker

Notable residents
 Robert A. Baker, psychologist, author, influential skeptic, and Past Fellow of the Committee for Skeptical Inquiry
 William O. Head, mayor of Louisville, Kentucky from 1909 to 1913
 Kristen Johnson, Miss Kentucky USA 2005, 2nd runner-up Miss USA 2005, Miss Kentucky Teen USA 2000, 2nd runner-up Miss Teen USA 2000, Miss Photogenic
 Chris Knight, musician/songwriter.
 Cale Young Rice, American poet and dramatist.
 Laban Lacy Rice, educator, author, and President of Cumberland University
 Garrett L. Withers, represented Kentucky in both the United States Senate and the House of Representatives
Amy Slaton-Halterman, reality TV star
Tammy Slaton, reality TV star

See also
 National Register of Historic Places listings in Webster County, Kentucky

References

 
Kentucky counties
1860 establishments in Kentucky
Evansville metropolitan area
Populated places established in 1860